Sungai Burong is a town in Tanjung Karang, Selangor, Malaysia.

Kuala Selangor District
Towns in Selangor